The Federal Medical Center, Rochester (FMC Rochester) is a United States federal prison in Minnesota for male inmates requiring specialized or long-term medical or mental health care. It is designated as an administrative facility, which means it holds inmates of all security classifications. It is operated by the Federal Bureau of Prisons, a division of the United States Department of Justice.

Facility
FMC Rochester is one of six medical referral centers within the Federal Bureau of Prisons. Health Services staff at FMC include physicians, a dentist, dental assistants, nurse practitioners, physician assistants, nurses, pharmacists, pharmacy technicians, a radiological technician, physical therapists, laboratory technologists and a respiratory therapist. Mental Health Services through the Psychiatry and Psychology Departments are available to all inmates. These include educational groups, therapy groups, individual therapy, intensive diagnosis/assessment, and inpatient treatment. In addition, outpatient substance abuse treatment services are available.

In 2009 Philip Fornaci, the director of the DC Prisoners' Project, stated that Rochester, along with FMC Butner and FMC Carswell, "are clearly the "gold standard" in terms of what BOP facilities can achieve in providing medical care" and that they had provided "excellent medical care, sometimes for extremely complex medical needs."

Notable incidents
In July 2009, Richard Torres, a correction officer at FMC Rochester, was indicted for smuggling contraband into the facility for an inmate in exchange for thousands of dollars in bribes. The contraband included cellular telephones, tobacco and creatine powder. Torres was terminated and pleaded guilty to soliciting a bribe two months later and was sentenced to one year in federal prison.

Notable inmates

Current

Former

See also

List of U.S. federal prisons
Federal Bureau of Prisons
Incarceration in the United States

References

External links
FMC Rochester

Rochester
Buildings and structures in Rochester, Minnesota
Rochester
1984 establishments in Minnesota